MacMasters Beach is a south-eastern suburb of the Central Coast region of New South Wales, Australia on the Bouddi Peninsula. It is part of the  local government area

It was named after Allan MacMaster who was one of the first land owners in this area in 1855 after coming to Australia in 1839 from Scotland. Locals often describe it as having a 'village feel' and strong sense of community.

Gallery

References

Suburbs of the Central Coast (New South Wales)